Karl Larsson (8 July 1865 – 24 January 1943) was a Swedish sport shooter who competed in the 1912 Summer Olympics and in the 1920 Summer Olympics.

He was born in Borås. In 1912 he finished fourth in the 100 metre running deer, single shots event. Eight years later he was a member of the Swedish team which finished fourth in the team 100 metre running deer, single shots competition.

References

1865 births
1943 deaths
Swedish male sport shooters
Running target shooters
Olympic shooters of Sweden
Shooters at the 1912 Summer Olympics
Shooters at the 1920 Summer Olympics
People from Borås
Sportspeople from Västra Götaland County